Derazi may refer to:
 Derazi, Bushehr
 Derazi, Lorestan